"Mama He's Crazy" is a song written by Kenny O'Dell, and originally recorded by American country music duo The Judds. It was released in April 1984 as the second single from their debut January 1984 EP Wynonna & Naomi. The song was re-released on their full-length 1984 debut album Why Not Me. The song was their second hit and the first of 14 number one singles. The single went to number one for one week and spent a total of 14 weeks on the country chart. It was only the second country number one sung by a female duo; previously only The Davis Sisters featuring Skeeter Davis had made it to number one on the country chart in 1953 with their song "I Forgot More Than You'll Ever Know".

Cover versions
 In 1984, Pinkard & Bowden released a parody of the song titled "Mama She's Lazy". This parody went to number 39 on the country music charts.
 In 2007, Jill Johnson covered the song on Music Row.

Charts

Weekly charts

Year-end charts

Certifications

References

1984 singles
The Judds songs
Songs written by Kenny O'Dell
RCA Records singles
Curb Records singles
Jill Johnson songs
Song recordings produced by Brent Maher
1983 songs